Dorothy Ruth "Dolly" Pratt (born 11 March 1955) is an Australian politician. Born in Coffs Harbour, New South Wales, she was a Justice of the Peace and coffee shop proprietor in Queensland before entering politics. She also worked at cattle sale yards. At the 1998 state election, she won the seat of Barambah in the Legislative Assembly of Queensland, representing Pauline Hanson's One Nation. She left One Nation in 1999 to sit as an independent. In 2001, her seat of Barambah was abolished and largely replaced with Nanango, which she won as an independent. Pratt was re-elected in 2004, 2006 and 2009. Pratt stood down at the 2012 election. She is married with three children.

References

1955 births
Living people
One Nation members of the Parliament of Queensland
Independent members of the Parliament of Queensland
Members of the Queensland Legislative Assembly
People from Coffs Harbour
21st-century Australian politicians
21st-century Australian women politicians
Women members of the Queensland Legislative Assembly